"Be There" is a song by British electronic group Unkle. It was produced by member DJ Shadow and written by him along with British musician Ian Brown, who is also featured on the song on vocals. The song is featured on 1999 bonus tracks editions of Psyence Fiction, and was released as the second single from the album. The track is, essentially, a vocal version of the instrumental track "Unreal" from Psyence Fiction.

The song became Unkle's first major hit on any singles chart, peaking at number 8 on the UK Singles Chart and becoming the group's most commercially successful song to date. The UK Enhanced CD release of the single is notable in that across its three tracks it features contributions from DJ Shadow, James Lavelle, The Stone Roses' Ian Brown, Oasis's Noel Gallagher, Radiohead's Thom Yorke and The Beastie Boys' Mike D.

Music video
The song's music video was directed by Jake Scott and features a woman (played by Emma Griffiths Malin) at Mornington Crescent tube station.

Track listing
UK 12" single (MW108)
 Be There (featuring Ian Brown) - 5:16
 Be There (Underdog Remix) - 5:30 
 The Knock On Effect (remix by Noel Gallagher) - 6:12

UK CD1 single (MW108CD1)
 Be There (featuring Ian Brown) - 5:16
 Be There (Underdog Remix) - 5:30 	
 Be There (Underdog Instrumental) - 5:29 	

UK CD2 single (MW108CD2)
 Be There (featuring Ian Brown) (Radio Edit) - 4:22 	
 The Knock On Effect (remix by Noel Gallagher) - 6:12
 Rabbit In Your Headlights (Instrumental) - 5:59
 Rabbit In Your Headlights (featuring Thom Yorke) (Enhanced CD video) - 5:00

Japanese CD EP (TFCK-87973)
 Be There (featuring Ian Brown) - 5:16 	
 Be There (Underdog Remix) - 5:30 	
 Unreal (KZA & Kent Remix) - 5:51 mislabeled as Be There (KZA & Kent Remix)	 
 The Knock On Effect (remix by Noel Gallagher) - 6:13
 The Knock (Indopepsychics Remix) - 5:21
 Celestial Annihilation (Dub Version) - 4:43
 Celestial Annihilation (DJ Assault Remix) - 3:59
 Celestial Annihilation (The Committee Remix) - 3:54

Charts

References

1999 singles
Ian Brown songs
Unkle songs
1998 songs
Songs written by Ian Brown
A&M Records singles
Trip hop songs
Songs written by DJ Shadow